Waytayuq (Quechua wayta crest; wild flower; the whistling of the wind, -yuq a suffix to indicate ownership, "the one with a crest", "the one with wild flowers" or "the one with the whistling of the wind", Hispanicized spelling Huaytayoc) is a mountain in the Andes of Peru, about  high. It is situated in the Ayacucho Region, Lucanas Province, on the border of the districts of Carmen Salcedo and Chipao. Waytayuq lies south of Chunta.

References 

Mountains of Peru
Mountains of Ayacucho Region